The 1998 Copa Interamericana was the 18th and final staging of the Copa Interamericana. The final took place between D.C. United and Vasco da Gama and was staged over two legs on 14 November 1998 and 5 December 1998. Both matches were played in the United States—the first in Washington, D.C., was won 1–0 by Vasco da Gama; the second leg in Fort Lauderdale was won 2–0 by D.C. United.

D.C. United won their first Copa Interamericana, winning the series 2–1 on aggregate. They are the only team from the United States to win the competition. D.C. United head coach Bruce Arena left the team after the match to manage the United States men's national soccer team.

Qualified teams

Venues

Match details

First leg

Second leg

References

International club association football competitions hosted by the United States
Copa Interamericana 1998
Copa Interamericana 1998
Copa Interamericana, 1998
Inter
Copa Interamericana
Copa Interamericana 1998
Copa Interamericana 1998